The Saurer Tartaruga (Turtle) was a prototype of an armored personnel carrier from the Adolph Saurer AG. The Saurer Tartaruga was built in 1959. Together with the Mowag Pirat it was tested by the Swiss Army. But unexpectedly the Swiss Army decided to buy the American M113. A prototype is now in the Thun tank museum.

References 
  Kurt Sahli: Saurer. Geschichte einer Nutzfahrzeugfabrik. Stämpfli Verlag AG, Bern 1987
  Stefan Keller (Historiker): Die Zeit der Fabriken. Von Arbeitern und einer roten Stadt. Rotpunktverlag, Zürich 2001
  Hans Ulrich Wipf, Mario König, Adrian Knoepfli: Saurer. Vom Ostschweizer Kleinbetrieb zum internationalen Technologiekonzern, hier+jetzt, Verlag für Kultur und Geschichte, Baden 2003, 
  Markus Mäder: Drei Generationen Saurer. Franz Saurer (1806-1882), Adolph Saurer (1841-1920), Hippolyt Saurer (1878-1936). Schweizer Pioniere der Wirtschaft und Technik, Band 48, herausgegeben vom Verein für wirtschaftshistorische Studien, Meilen 1988

Armoured fighting vehicles of Switzerland
Abandoned military projects of Switzerland